Babaroga is the Serbo-Croatian name for Baba Yaga.

Babaroga may also refer to:

Babaroga (game company)
 Babaroga (album)